The E. B. Shelfer House is a historic home in Quincy, Florida, United States. It is located at 205 North Madison Street. On April 4, 1975, it was added to the U.S. National Register of Historic Places.

References

External links
 Gadsden County listings at National Register of Historic Places
 Florida's Office of Cultural and Historical Programs
 Gadsden County listings
 E.B. Shelfer House

Houses in Gadsden County, Florida
Houses on the National Register of Historic Places in Florida
Vernacular architecture in Florida
National Register of Historic Places in Gadsden County, Florida
Houses completed in 1903
1903 establishments in Florida